Barrowman is a surname. Notable people with the surname include:

 Andrew Barrowman (born 1984), Scottish footballer
 Carole Barrowman (born 1959) Scottish-American writer, professor and columnist.
 John Barrowman (born 1967), Scottish-American actor
 Mike Barrowman (born 1968), American swimmer
 Doug Barrowman (born 1965), Scottish businessman whose companies promoted schemes to contractors now pursued by HMRC for tax avoidance